RIVR Media is an American-based TV production company, specializing in reality and documentary programming. RIVR is responsible for Fixer to Fabulous, Whale Wars, Trading Spaces, Escaping Polygamy, Fat Guys in the Woods, Renovation Realities, Going RV, Friday Night Impossible with Jerry Rice,  Great American Heroes featuring Trace Adkins, Run My Renovation, and much more. It provides programming for cable networks, including A&E, HGTV, DIY Network, GAC, Lifetime Movie Network, MTV, Fine Living, Discovery Channel, Travel Channel, Weather Channel, History Channel, ESPN, Animal Planet, Game Show Network, TLC, Nickelodeon, Food Network, Court TV and TNN.

RIVR's production credits include documentaries, reality series, sitcoms, travel series, sports entertainment, and post-production services.

RIVR Media is owned by  partners Dee Haslam and Lori Golden-Stryer, and is located in Knoxville, Tennessee. Both Haslam and Stryer are Executive Producers for the company. Lori Golden-Stryer is CEO. She and HGTV co-founder, Bob Baskerville, are partners and co-owners of RIVR Studios, newly-renovated facilities in Knoxville, available to rent for shoots. After 20 years at RIVR, Rob Lundgren retired in 2019.

Company history 
RIVR Media originally derives from Bagwell Communications, run by Ross Bagwell Sr. and Ross Bagwell Jr., a Knoxville Tennessee-based advertising agency. In 1985 Bagwell Communications formed a company named 'Cinetel Productions' and engaged with the cable network The Nashville Network (TNN) to produce 415 episodes of I-40 Paradise.

Over the next ten years, Cinetel developed programs for A&E, the History Channel, the Discovery Channel, The Learning Channel, Travel Channel, Nickelodeon, and The Nashville Network. In 1994 Cinetel was sold to Scripps Howard, a national media company looking to launch HGTV. In 1998, Cinetel was renamed Scripps Productions. After the acquisition, the Bagwells formed a new company, Bagwell Entertainment LLC / Ross Television Productions, and continued producing programs for a variety of cable networks, including HGTV.

In 1999, Dee Haslam and business partner Rob Lundgren assumed control of Bagwell Entertainment renaming the company RIVR Media. In 2000 RIVR established RIVR Media Interactive—now RIVR Digital, which focuses on short form video production and marketing. In 2002 RIVR established RIVR Media Studios, a subsidiary focused on for-hire production and post-production services.

List of shows produced 
 Trading Spaces on TLC
 Whale Wars on Animal Planet
 Renovation Realities on DIY
 Fat Guys in the Woods on The Weather Channel
 Fixer to Fabulous on HGTV
 Friday Night Impossible with Jerry Rice on GAC
 Escaping Polygamy on Lifetime Movie Network
 Great American Heroes featuring Trace Adkins on GAC
 Going RV on GAC
 Warehouse Warriors on DIY
 Run My Renovation on DIY
 All Star Kitchen Makeover on the Food Network
 America's Castles on A&E
 America's Riverboat Casinos on the Travel Channel
 An Evening with Louis Grizzard on TNN
 Appalachian Stories on the Travel Channel
 Backyard Habitat on Animal Planet
 Blog Cabin on DIY
 Catastrophe Inc. on DIY
 Classic Car Restoration on DIY
 Classic Rides on DIY
 Club Dance on TNN
 Dance Line on TNN
 Dancin' at the Hot Spots on TNN
 Date Plate on the Food Network
 Divine Canine on Animal Planet
 DIY to the Rescue on DIY
 Earthguide on the Discovery Channel
 Easy Does It on the Discovery Channel
 Ed the Plumber on DIY
 Elvis Presley's Graceland on the Discovery Channel
 Elvis Presley's Memphis on the Travel Channel
 Exploring America on the Travel Channel
 Family Table with Naomi Judd on the Food Network
 Floors, Doors & Windows on DIY
 Freeform Furniture on DIY
 Gambling Games – Beating the House on the Discovery Channel
 Gambling Games – Why the House Wins on the Discovery Channel
 Garage Mahal on DIY
 Good Life with Eddie Ellis on HGTV
 Great Train Stations on the History Channel
 Grounds for Improvement on DIY
 Happy Trails Theatre on TNN
 Hardscapes on DIY
 Help on the Homefront on DIY
 Hey Dude on Nickelodeon
 High Roller's Vegas on the Discovery Channel
 High Roller's Vegas 2 – The New Breed on the Discovery Channel
 Homebodies on TLC
 Homebuilding Digest on HGTV
 The Human Canvas on TLC
 Human Canvas 2 – Scared Skin on TLC
 I-40 Paradise on TNN
 Kitchen Accomplished on the Food Network
 Knight School on ESPN
 Lie Detector on Court TV
 Little People: Big Conventions on the Travel Channel
 Mailorder Makeover on Fine Living
 Material Girls on DIY
 Melody Ranch Theatre on TNN
 Move it Outside on DIY
 Naomi's Country Stars on the Food Network
 Nick America on Nickelodeon
 Non-Stop Slots on the Travel Channel
 Pickin' at the Paradise on TNN
 Randy Travis Happy Trails on TNN
 Ready for the Road on TNN
 Remodeling and Decorating Today on TNN
 Robot Rivals on DIY
 Rollerjam on TNN
 Rollerjam Reborn on TNN
 Score on MTV
 Shadetree Mechanic on TNN
 Tag Team on the Game Show Network
 Tattoo Crazy on the Travel Channel
 Tough Car Challenge on TNN
 Travel Quest on A&E
 US Poker Championship on the Travel Channel and ESPN
 Ultimate Workshop II on DIY
 Vegas Deals Revealed on the Travel Channel
 Weekend Mechanic on DIY
 The Whole Picture on DIY
 Wish You Were Here on TNN
 World Series of Poker on the Discovery Channel
 The World's Largest Hotel on the Discovery Channel
 Your Home Studio on TNN

Notes and references

External links 
 Official website

Television production companies of the United States
Companies based in Knoxville, Tennessee